The 1998 Danish Figure Skating Championships was held from 12 to 14 December 1997. Skaters competed in the disciplines of men's singles and ladies' singles. Not all disciplines were held on all levels due to a lack of participants.

Senior results

Men

Ladies

External links
 results

Danish Figure Skating Championships
1997 in figure skating
Danish Figure Skating Championships, 1998
Figure Skating Championships